Broadcasters for the Houston Astros Major League Baseball team.

Play by Play
Gene Elston (1962–1986)
Loel Passe (1962–1976)
Guy Savage (1962–1963)
Al Helfer (1962)
Mickey Herskowitz (1963)
Harry Kalas (1965–1970)
Bob Prince (1976)
Dewayne Staats (1977–1984)
Mike Elliott (1984)
Larry Hirsch (1984)
Jim Durham (1984–1985)
Milo Hamilton (1985–2012) (only home games from 2006–2012)
Jerry Trupiano (1985–1986)
Bill Worrell (1986–1996, 2000–2003)
Dave Hofferth (1987)
Bill Brown (1987–2016) (just home games and select road games from 2013–2016)
Bruce Gietzen (1988–1990)
Vince Cotroneo (1991–1997)
Brett Dolan (2006–2012) (about 1/2 of the home games (switching off and on with Dave Raymond) and all road games)
Dave Raymond (2006–2012) (about 1/2 of the home games (switching off and on with Brett Dolan) and all road games)
Alan Ashby (1998–2006 (radio); 2013–2016 (television) (from 1998–2006, he provided 2 innings of play-by-play on the radio and from 2013–2016, he provided play-by-play for games without Bill Brown)
Robert Ford (2013–present)
Steve Sparks (2013–present) (2 innings a game on radio)
Todd Kalas (2017–present)
Kevin Eschenfelder (2017–present)

Color Analyst
Larry Dierker (1979–1996, 2004–2005)
Enos Cabell (1989–1994)
Alan Ashby (radio: 1998–2005), (TV: 2013–2016)
Jim Deshaies (1997–2012)
Steve Sparks (2013–present)
Geoff Blum (2013–present) (road games with Ashby and select home games, 2013–2016; home and road games 2017–present)

Spanish

René Cárdenas (1962–1977, 2007)
Orlando Sanchez-Diago (1962–1992)
Rolando Becerra (1987–1992)
Francisco Ernesto Ruiz (1993–2007)
Manny Lopez (1993)
Danny Gonzalez (1994–1996)
Alex Treviño (1997–Present)
Adrian Chavarria (2006–2007)
Enrique Vasquez (2006)
Francisco Romero (2008–Present)

Broadcast Outlets

Television
Over-the-air
KTRK-TV (1962–1972)
KPRC-TV (1973–1978)
KRIV (1979–1982)
KTXH (1983–1997, 2008–2011)
KNWS-TV (1998–2007)
KUBE-TV (2013–present)

Cable
Home Sports Entertainment/Prime Sports Southwest/Fox Sports Southwest (1983–2004)
Fox Sports Houston (2005–2012)
Comcast Sportsnet Houston/Root Sports Southwest/AT&T Sportsnet Southwest (2013–present)

Note: Fox Sports Houston was originally a sub-feed of Fox Sports Southwest from 2005 to 2008; however, the Houston feed became its own standalone channel as of January 2009.
Note: Comcast Sportsnet Houston became Root Sports Southwest in November, 2014 which later became AT&T Sportsnet Southwest in July, 2017

Spanish language
 unknown

Radio
KPRC (AM) (1962–1980)
KNTH (1981–1982)
KRBE (1983–1984)
KTRH (1985–1995, 1999–2012)
KILT (AM) (1996–1998)
KBME (AM) (2013–present)

Spanish Radio
KXTN-FM (1988)
KXYZ (1989–2002)
KLAT (2003–2014; 2021-present)
KODA HD-3 (2015-2017)
KEYH / KNTE (2018-2020)

See also
 List of current Major League Baseball announcers
 Houston Astros Radio Network

References

Houston Astros
Houston Astros announcers
Broadcasters
Prime Sports
Fox Sports Networks
AT&T SportsNet